António José Lima Pereira (1 February 1952 – 22 January 2022) was a Portuguese footballer who played as a central defender.

Club career
Born in Póvoa de Varzim, Lima Pereira started playing professionally for hometown club Varzim, making his Primeira Liga debut in the 1976–77 season at the age of 24. Two years later he signed with Porto, where he would remain for the following 11 campaigns.

Lima Pereira appeared in 265 competitive games during his spell at the Estádio das Antas, winning four national championships, two domestic cups and four Supercups. He also reached the final of the 1983–84 European Cup Winners' Cup as his team lost to Juventus 2–1. Aged already 34/35, he was also part of the team's victorious campaign in the European Cup in 1986–87, although he did not play in the final against Bayern Munich due to injury.

In 1989, Lima Pereira left Porto and signed for another northern side, Maia of the Segunda Liga, retiring after two seasons at 39.

International career
Lima Pereira won 20 caps for Portugal, the first arriving in 1981 at the age of 29. He was a participant at UEFA Euro 1984, helping the national team reach the semi-finals in France.

Personal life and death
Lima Pereira's younger brothers, António (born 1966) and Paulo (1967), were also professional footballers and defenders. Both started their careers at Varzim, and their second main clubs were Felgueiras and Rio Ave, amassing top-division totals of 33 and 113 matches respectively. His nephew Tiago also represented Varzim.

On 22 January 2022, Lima Pereira died at the age of 69.

Honours
Varzim
Segunda Divisão: 1975–76

Porto
Primeira Divisão: 1978–79, 1984–85, 1985–86, 1987–88
Taça de Portugal: 1983–84, 1987–88 
Supertaça Cândido de Oliveira: 1981, 1983, 1984
European Cup: 1986–87
European Super Cup: 1987
Intercontinental Cup: 1987

References

External links

1952 births
2022 deaths
People from Póvoa de Varzim
Sportspeople from Porto District
Portuguese footballers
Association football defenders
Primeira Liga players
Liga Portugal 2 players
Varzim S.C. players
FC Porto players
F.C. Maia players
Portugal international footballers
UEFA Euro 1984 players